The Battersea Poltergeist is a horror podcast and audio drama produced by BBC Radio 4 and presented by Danny Robins. The show was nominated for a British Podcast Award, Audio and Radio Industry Award, and a New York Festivals Radio Award. The podcast was later adapted into two television series.

Background 
The podcast was produced by BBC Radio 4 and presented by Danny Robins. The podcast is a documentary of a true story with dramatized reenactment.

Reception 
Nicholas Quah wrote in Vulture that "It's nothing transcendental, but boy is it a good time."

Awards

Adaptation 
In May 2021, the podcast was set to be adapted into a scripted and unscripted series. The adaptation was created by Maniac Productions and Blumhouse Productions and distributed by Peacock. The scripted series is titled The Battersea Poltergeist and the unscripted series is called Blumhouse's Ghost Story. The companies also secured the rights to the book called "The Poltergeist Prince of London: The Remarkable True Story of the Battersea Poltergeist".

References

External links 
 

Audio podcasts
2021 podcast debuts
2021 podcast endings
Horror podcasts
Scripted podcasts
Documentary podcasts
BBC Radio 4 programmes